Brand New Dance is an album which Emmylou Harris released on October 16, 1990.  Produced by Richard Bennett and Allan Reynolds, the album mixed a rather eclectic collection of covers, including Bruce Springsteen's "Tougher Than the Rest", and Dave Mallett's "Red, Red Rose".  Though it sold reasonably well, it was Harris' first studio album in fifteen years to yield no top forty country singles, and marked the beginning of a commercial decline for the singer, which would ultimately lead her to redirect her music away from mainstream country, a few years later.

Track listing

Personnel 

 Richard Bennett – Acoustic & Electric Guitar, Bass, Mandolin, Tambourine, Producer, 6-String Bass
 Mary Black – Harmony Vocals
 Bruce Bouton – Steel Guitar
 Marshall Chapman – Harmony Vocals
 Kathy Chiavola – Harmony Vocals
 Charles Cochran – String Arrangements
 Iris DeMent – Harmony Vocals
 Stuart Duncan – Fiddle, Mandolin
 Connie Ellisor – Strings
 Peter Gorisch – Cello
 Carl Gorodetzky – Strings
 Jim Grosjean – Strings
 Emmylou Harris – Acoustic Guitar, Vocals, Harmony Vocals
 James Hollihan, Jr. – Slide Guitar
 Roy M. "Junior" Husky – Bass
 John Jarvis – Piano
 Kieran Kane – Harmony Vocals
 Dolores Keane – Harmony Vocals
 Kostas – Harmony Vocals
 Lee Larrison – Strings
 Chris Leuzinger – Acoustic & Electric Guitar
 Laura LiPuma – Art Direction, Design
 Claire Lynch – Harmony Vocals
 Ted Madsen – Strings
 Kenny Malone – Percussion, Drums
 Robert Mason – Strings
 Mark Miller – Engineer, Mixing
 Dennis Molchan – Strings
 Laura Molyneaux – Strings
 Melba Montgomery – Harmony Vocals
 Peter Nash – Photography
 Nashville String Machine – Strings, Group
 Liam O'Flynn – Whistle (Human), Uilleann pipes
 Jamie O'Hara – Harmony Vocals
 Wayland Patton – Harmony Vocals
 Dave Pomeroy – Bass
 Denny Purcell – Mastering
 Allen Reynolds – Producer
 Pamela Sixfin – Strings
 Milton Sledge – Percussion, Drums
 Jo-El Sonnier – Triangle, French Accordion
 Davy Spillane – Whistle (Human), Uilleann pipes
 Harry Stinson – Drums
 Garry Tallent – Bass
 Mark Tanner – Strings
 Barry Tashian – Harmony Vocals
 Gary VanOsdale – Strings
 Pete Wasner – Piano
 Kristin Wilkinson – Strings
 Bobby Wood – Organ, Piano, Keyboards, Electric Piano
 Glenn Worf – Bass
 Bob Wray – Bass
 Cindy Reynolds Wyatt – Harp

Chart performance

References 

Emmylou Harris albums
1990 albums
Albums produced by Allen Reynolds
Albums produced by Richard Bennett (guitarist)
Warner Records albums